Austin Woolfolk (1796—1847) was an American slave trader. He became notorious for selling Frederick Douglass's aunt, and for assaulting Benjamin Lundy after the latter had criticized him.

Early life
Austin Woolfolk was born in 1796 in the U.S. state of Georgia. He moved to Baltimore in 1819.

Career
Woolfolk became a slave trader in Baltimore, where he had an office on Pratt Street, with a pen where he kept his slaves. Even though he advertised in newspapers, he moved his slaves at night to avoid attracting attention. He became notorious for selling Frederick Douglass's aunt, and for assaulting Benjamin Lundy after the latter had criticized him.

Woolfolk was driven "out of business" by slave traders Isaac Franklin and John Armfield when they moved to Baltimore.

Slack Family Papers.  Manuscripts Dept, Library of the UNC  at Chapel Hill - SOUTHERN HISTORICAL COLLECTION.  Louisiana Tennessee Woolfolk married Henry Richmond Slack.  (http://www.lib.unc.edu/mss/inv/s/Slack_Family)

Austin Woolfolk was later buried at Rosedale Cemetery, Rosedale, Iberville Parish, Louisiana.  FindaGrave # 11345605

Death
The Tennessean of Nashville, issue of March 5, 1847, Page 2

DIED - In Auburn, Macon County, Ala., on the 10th inst., Austin Woolfolk, on his way from Baltimore to his home and family in Louisiana, in the fond-hope of reaching them ere death had laid his icy hand upon him, he struggled on from place to place, against tho advice of his friends and the ruthlossinoss of his desease, notwithstanding he was utterly unfit to bear the fatigues of traveling, and the unavoidable exposure to an inclement season. He died about 50 years of age after an illness of two years duration, his constitution, originally a strong" one, gradually giving way, despite of human remedies, to the foil destroyer, Consumption. Though far from home and family, his last moments were not soothed and tended by strangers alone. His Uncle, John Woolfolk, was with him, and brought his remans to be interred in the cemetery of this city. To the people of Auburn, his relatives here, and bereaved family, owe many thanks, for their kindness and attention to him in his last illness.  He left a Father, a Brother and three Sisters in Tennessee, and a wife and five children in Louisiana, to mourn their loss.
Columbus Enq. Ga.

Woolfolk died 10 February 1847 in Auburn, Alabama.

References

1796 births
1847 deaths
People from Georgia (U.S. state)
People from Baltimore
American slave traders
19th-century American businesspeople